Adrián Pedrozo Castillo (born 8 July 1948) is a Mexican politician affiliated with the Party of the Democratic Revolution. He served as Deputy of the LX Legislature of the Mexican Congress representing the Federal District.

References

1948 births
Living people
People from Zitácuaro
Politicians from Michoacán
Party of the Democratic Revolution politicians
21st-century Mexican politicians
National Autonomous University of Mexico alumni
Deputies of the LX Legislature of Mexico
Members of the Chamber of Deputies (Mexico) for Mexico City